State Route 200 (SR 200) is a primary state highway in the U.S. state of Virginia. The state highway runs  from SR 3 in White Stone north to U.S. Route 360 (US 360) at Burgess. SR 200 is the main north–south highway of the eastern end of the Northern Neck. The state highway connects the Lancaster County towns of White Stone, Irvington, and Kilmarnock, where the highway intersects SR 3 again, with eastern Northumberland County.

Route description

SR 200 begins at an intersection with SR 3 (Rappahannock Drive) in the town of White Stone. The state highway heads west as Chesapeake Drive, which becomes Irvington Road on leaving the town. SR 200 crosses the Eastern Branch of Carter Creek into the town of Irvington, where the highway curves north. The state highway leaves the town and passes through the hamlet of Pitmans Corner, the site of historic Christ Church. North of Pitmans Corner, SR 200 meets the northern end of SR 222 (Weems Road) and veers northeast to the town of Kilmarnock. In the center of town, the state highway briefly runs concurrently with SR 3 (Main Street).

SR 200 continues north along Church Street and roughly follows the height of land between the direct Chesapeake Bay drainage on the east and the watershed of the Corrotoman River, a tributary of the Rappahannock River, on the west; the drainage boundary also forms the boundary between Lancaster and Northumberland counties. Three blocks north of SR 3, the state highway runs on top of the county line to the northern edge of Kilmarnock, where the highway has two stretches where it veers west of the county boundary. At the hamlet of Good Luck, SR 200 fully enters Northumberland County for the first time and the route's name becomes Jessie DuPont Memorial Highway, named for the 20th century philanthropist Jessie Ball duPont. South of Mount Olive, the state highway briefly re-enters Lancaster County before returning to Northumberland County for good. SR 200 passes through the village of Wicomico Church and crosses the Great Wicomico River between Tipers and Blackwells. The state highway reaches its northern terminus at US 360 (Northumberland Highway) in the village of Burgess.

Major intersections

References

External links

Virginia Highways Project: VA 200

200
State Route 200
State Route 200